Ditrigona wilkinsoni is a moth in the family Drepanidae. It was described by Jeremy Daniel Holloway in 1998. It is found on Borneo and possibly Peninsular Malaysia.

References

Moths described in 1998
Drepaninae
Moths of Asia